This article shows the roster of all participating teams at the 2016 FIVB Volleyball World Grand Prix.

Group 1

























Group 2

















Group 3

















References

External links

2016
2016 in volleyball